South Shore Academy (formerly Palatine Community Sports College) is a school in South Shore, Blackpool, Lancashire. A National Lottery Grant enabled the High School to be turned into a Community Sports College.
A new leisure centre has been built on the grounds. The £6.5 million centre was opened on 13 February 2006, by Tessa Jowell. Palatine expanded the sports it provides for children in P.E. and started a new course, B-Tec first diploma in sport.

In December 2013 the former Palatine Community Sports College was converted into an academy by Bright Futures Education Trust (BFET)

The Ofsted inspection 
The 2012 Ofsted inspection reported the school to be "...an improving and increasingly popular school where standards and achievements are rising". The Ofsted inspection was the first in six years.

References

Jane Baily

External links
  school website
 partnership website

Academies in Blackpool
Secondary schools in Blackpool